Opharus navatteae is a moth of the family Erebidae. It was described by Hervé de Toulgoët in 2000. It is found in Peru.

References

Opharus
Moths described in 2000
Moths of South America